Rosa davidii also known as Father David's rose, is a rose species in the family Rosaceae, originating from western to central China and South-East Tibet in altitudes between 1600 and 3000 m above sea level.

Description
Prickles are sparse to scattered along the stalks.

The flowers have five petals and appear in clusters of four to twelve.

References

davidii
Taxa named by François Crépin